Eline De Munck (born 22 January 1988), also known by the stage name Ellektra, is a Belgian singer and actress.

De Munck released her first album, More Is More, in 2010. She now appears on Q-music's radio program Que Pasa.

Discography

Albums

Singles

References

External links
 
 
 

1988 births
Capitol Records artists
Living people
Munck, Eline De
21st-century Belgian women singers
21st-century Belgian singers